Gardeners who have achieved fame through their pioneering innovations, writing or, more often, their television personas, may be classed as celebrity gardeners.

The writing of Helena Rutherfurd Ely, C. Z. Guest and Esther Deans brought them enough fame for them to be considered celebrity gardeners.

In England, the Royal Horticultural Society has described both Alan Titchmarsh and Monty Don as celebrity gardeners.

Notable gardeners on radio and television

 Craig Allison – host of The Carefree Gardener
 Chris Beardshaw
 Matthew Biggs – Gardeners' Question Time
 Don Burke – host of Burke's Backyard; producer of Backyard Blitz
 Danny Clarke - British horticulturist, host of BBC series The Instant Gardener
 James Underwood Crockett – original host of The Victory Garden
 Peter Cundall – host of ABC TV's Gardening Australia
 Charlie Dimmock
 Harry Dodson – head gardener for the BBC television show The Victorian Kitchen Garden
 David Domoney – gardener on ITV1's Love Your Garden and ITV's This Morning
 Monty Don – host of BBC2's Gardeners' World
 Art Drysdale – Canadian gardener with various broadcasts
 Jamie Durie – host of axed show Backyard Blitz on Channel Nine; now host of Australia's Best Backyards on Channel Seven 
 Bob Flowerdew – Gardeners Question Time
 Alan Gardener – British Channel4 series The Autistic Gardener
 Diarmuid Gavin – garden designer; television host of Homefront in the Garden
 Pippa Greenwood – Gardeners' Question Time
 Carol Klein – BBC2's Gardeners' World
 Roy Lancaster
 Sarah Raven – BBC2's Gardeners' World
 P. Allen Smith
 Joe Swift – BBC2's Gardeners' World
 Percy Thrower – Britain's first celebrity gardener
 Alan Titchmarsh – writer for BBC Gardeners' World magazine; celebrity television gardener
 Brian Welch – freelance celebrity gardener
 James Wong – BBC science presenter and obsessive foodie grower

See also

 List of professional gardeners

References

Lists of television presenters
Radio presenters